Modupe Oshikoya (born 2 May 1954) is a former female track and field athlete from Nigeria, who competed in the women's sprint and long jump events during her career.  She is a one-time Olympian (1972), and also competed in the heptathlon. Oshikoya won a total number of five gold medals at the All-Africa Games (1973 and 1978). Oshikoya competed and won Gold for her University in the US, UCLA in the 100 meters, the Long Jump, 100 meters hurdles and the hepthatlon at the NCAA championships in 1982.

External links
 

1954 births
Living people
Nigerian heptathletes
Nigerian female sprinters
Nigerian female hurdlers
Nigerian female long jumpers
Nigerian female high jumpers
Olympic athletes of Nigeria
Athletes (track and field) at the 1972 Summer Olympics
Commonwealth Games gold medallists for Nigeria
Commonwealth Games medallists in athletics
Athletes (track and field) at the 1974 British Commonwealth Games
UCLA Bruins women's track and field athletes
Commonwealth Games silver medallists for Nigeria
African Games gold medalists for Nigeria
African Games medalists in athletics (track and field)
Athletes (track and field) at the 1973 All-Africa Games
Athletes (track and field) at the 1978 All-Africa Games
20th-century Nigerian women
Medallists at the 1974 British Commonwealth Games